Track Youth Theatre is an amateur youth theatre group, based in Boroondara, Victoria, Australia. The group was founded by Ed Bailey, who directed the productions from 1980–2013. Since 2013, productions have been directed by Melissa Dioguardi and Sophie Jevons.

The 2016 production marked the group's 50th production. Apart from, The Hobbit, in 1981, "Man of Steel", 1986, "Bats" 1987, "Sheerluck Holmes" 1988, "Sheik, Rattle and Roll" 1990 (the last four by Denver and Dorricot) and "Superheroes" by Peter Sala, all plays have been written by Ed Bailey.

Recent Productions
The 2017 Track Youth Theatre production was ‘Superheroes’, performed on the first and second of September 2017. 'Superheroes' was written by Peter Sala and directed by Sophie Jevons. This was the second time in Track Youth's history it was performed but with some updated script edits. 
The 2018 Track Youth Theatre production was "Oh What a Knight" written by Hayley Lawson-Smith with music and lyrics by Ed Bailey, and directed by Breanna Dioguardi.
The 2019 Track Youth Theatre production was "High School Cinderella" performed 30 And 31 August. It was directed by Sophie Jevons.
The 2020 Track Youth Theatre production was cancelled due to the COVID-19 pandemic. Instead, a production called "Once Upon a Pandemic" was recorded over Zoom.
The 2021 Track Youth Theatre production was "The Magic Clock". It was supposed to be performed on 27 and 28 August, but was cancelled due to the COVID-19 pandemic. Instead, the show was performed online using Zoom on 28 August.
In 2022, TYT is returning to live theatre with "Pirates!", written by Ed Bailey and directed by Sophie Jevons.

History
Track Youth Theatre originated from the amateur theatre group Toorak Players in 1980, as the Toorak Players Children's Workshop. Its first performance was a production of Sleeping Beauty, which they performed at the Pumpkin Theatre in Richmond. Due to the growing size of the group, the following year it performed at Kew High School's Renaissance Theatre, where it has performed ever since. Due to the COVID-19 pandemic, Track Youth Theatre performed online in 2020 and 2021.

List of Productions 2006–2021
2022 – Pirates

2021 – The Magic Clock

2020 – Once Upon a Pandemic

2019 –  High School Cinderella

2018 –  Oh What a Knight

2017 –  Superheroes

2016 –  No West for the Wicked

2015 – Rumpelstiltskin

2014 – Aladdin

2013 – Pot of Gold

2012 – Ali Baba

2011 – Sleeping Beauty

2010 – Cleopatra

2009 – Superheroes

2008 – Pirates

2007 – No West for the Wicked

2006 – Plain Princess

Notes

References 
 Interview with Ed Bailey by Derek Guille on ABC 774

External links
Track Youth Theatre Homepage

Amateur theatre companies in Australia
Youth theatre companies